Desmond Fenner (27 March 1929 – 31 August 2009) was a South African cricketer. He played in 52 first-class matches for Border from 1948/49 to 1966/67.

See also
 List of Border representative cricketers

References

External links
 

1929 births
2009 deaths
South African cricketers
Border cricketers